Robyn Scott (born 9 January 1981) is a British-born writer and entrepreneur.

She studied at Auckland University and Cambridge University. She was a Gates Scholar. Her first book, Twenty Chickens for a Saddle, a memoir about growing up in Botswana, was published in March 2008. Her second book, Big Like Coca-Cola, is about a group of maximum security prisoners in South Africa who have adopted AIDS orphans. Scott is also a co-founder of start-up OneLeap, and of Southern African social enterprises Brothers for All and Mothers for All. She is presently CEO of policy platform Apolitical.

Biography
Born in England, Scott moved with her parents to New Zealand briefly and then Botswana, where she spent most of her childhood. She attended high school in Bulawayo, Zimbabwe and subsequently studied Bioinformatics at the University of Auckland followed by a Master of Bioscience Enterprise at the University of Cambridge. She is an ambassador for the Access to Medicine Index and a World Economic Forum Young Global Leader. She was on Wired's 2012 Smart List of Fifty People Who Will Change The World. She is now CEO of Apolitical, a global platform for policymakers that specialises in government innovation.

Bibliography

Books 
 
 Scott, Robyn (Forthcoming). Big like Coca-Cola.

Articles

Radio

TEDx lectures

References

External links
 
 Official book site: twentychickensforasaddle.com
 Gates Scholar Newsletter Summer 2007
 Author Biography on Bloomsbury.com
 Robyn Scott's contact profile on oneleap.to

1981 births
Alumni of the University of Cambridge
Living people
New Zealand journalists
New Zealand women in business
University of Auckland alumni
21st-century New Zealand women writers
21st-century New Zealand writers
New Zealand women journalists